The Lexington Area Metropolitan Planning Organization (MPO) has been involved with transportation planning in Lexington, Kentucky, USA, and its immediate area since being established in 1974. It is responsible, in cooperation with the Kentucky Transportation Cabinet, for planning and coordinating all aspects of transportation planning on behalf of local governments within its region, which includes the Lexington-Fayette Urban County Government (the consolidated government of Lexington and Fayette County) and Jessamine County.

Organizational framework
The MPO was formed in 1974 when the committee structure was established by a letter from Mayor H. Foster Pettit to the Kentucky Secretary of Transportation, Calvin Grayson. The Transportation Policy Committee (TPC) is the decision making body of the Lexington Area MPO and is composed of the mayors of Lexington, Nicholasville, and Wilmore; the Fayette and Jessamine County Judge-Executives; the Vice Mayor of Lexington; six members of the Lexington-Fayette Urban County Council; the Chairman of LexTran; President of Federated Transportation Services of the Bluegrass (FTSB) and the Secretary for the Kentucky Transportation Cabinet (KYTC).

The TPC has several subcommittees that report to it: Transportation Technical Coordinating Committee (TTCC), Congestion Management Committee (CMC), Bicycle & Pedestrian Advisory Committee (BPAC), Air Quality Advisory Committee (AQAC), and Traffic Safety Coalition (TSC).

Plans and documents
The Lexington Area MPO, as part of its mandate, produces many plans and documents.  The Metropolitan Transportation Plan (MTP) is required by federal and state laws, and is the primary plan  for the future transportation system of the region. It is updated every 3–5 years. The Transportation Improvement Program (TIP) is updated more frequently and is more project-oriented. The MPO must also develop a Unified Planning Work Program (UPWP) which identifies where all of the money flowing into the MPO goes, including staffing and other administrative costs. The MPO also has a Participation Plan (PP), and develops many other plans and documents as directed by federal and state governmental bodies.

Work programs
There are several different areas within the MPO and planners that specialize in at least one area, although some cover multiple areas.

Air quality
The MPO monitors the air quality and level of ozone in the area. This includes a forecast from May to the end of September and alerts if the forecast approaches the level of unhealthy for sensitive groups. The MPO also educates the public about pollution reducing activities through the school system and extensive public service announcements.

Public transit
Transit planning is crucial for a growing region. The Lexington area is growing in population, and is forecast to continue this trend. Transit service is currently expanding, thanks in large part to a dedicated tax that was passed in 2004. Along with the expansion of service and routes comes an increased amount of transit planning work. Regular transit planning duties include developing a Long Range Transit Plan, developing maps and statistical reports, updating Title VI documentation, and various other activities.

Congestion management
The Congestion Management Process (CMP) alleviates, and mitigates traffic congestion in the MPO Planning Area which includes Lexington and Jessamine County. The CMP supports the planning process by providing information to assist transportation decision-making. An overview document was completed in March, 2011 and approved by the Congestion Management Committee.

The CMP utilizes several different methods to reduce traffic congestion. One innovative design that came out of one of the MPO's Congestion Management Studies is the Diverging diamond interchange (DDI). Because of the CMP suggesting that this type of interchange should be used to alleviate bottlenecks in the MPO area, KYTC chose to use a DDI design for the Harrodsburg Road and New Circle interchange. A public meeting was held on March 29, 2011, at Southern Hills United Methodist Church. This is the first Diverging Diamond Interchange (now called Double Crossover Diamond or DCD) in the state of Kentucky.

Bluegrass Mobility Office
The Lexington Bluegrass Mobility Office was established in 1997 by the LFUCG as the central point of contact in all inquiries concerning mobility (transportation) issues. The Mobility Office offers a carpool/vanpool computer ridematching program that includes LexVan, a work commute vanpool leasing program. These services are available to anyone that lives or works in Fayette or Jessamine County and commutes to or from the surrounding counties. Aimed at reducing air pollution, traffic and parking congestion, road repairs and gasoline consumption, the Mobility program is managed by the Lexington Area Metropolitan Planning Organization (MPO).

Bicycle and pedestrian
This is an ever-growing activity for the MPO. But it's more than just constructing and repairing sidewalks and bike lanes. A lot of it has to do with educating the public about the importance of having good bicycle and pedestrian connections for our community. As the population grows, it's important to plan for viable alternative transportation options, such as simply walking or biking to the grocery store or to work.

External links
 Survey on Double Crossover Diamond on Harrodsburg Rd
 Official website of Lexington Area Metropolitan Planning Organization

Transportation in Jessamine County, Kentucky
Metropolitan planning organizations
Transportation in Lexington, Kentucky
Local government in Kentucky